Ferner is a surname. Notable people with the surname include:

Diethelm Ferner (born 1941), German football coach and a former player
Finn Ferner (1920–2001), Norwegian sailor and Olympic medalist
Hans-Peter Ferner (born 1956), German former middle-distance runner, won the 800 m gold medal at the 1982 European Championships in Athletics
Johan Ferner (1927–2015), Norwegian sailor and Olympic medalist
Mark Ferner (born 1965), retired Canadian ice hockey defenceman
Max Ferner (born 1881), German playwright, born Maximilian Sommer
Mike Ferner, former Toledo, Ohio city council member, Vietnam era veteran, author, and peace activist
Nellie Ferner (1869–1930), New Zealand artist, photographer and community leader
Per Arne Ferner (born 1985), Norwegian jazz guitarist, known from bands like Flux and Ferner/Juliusson Duo
Princess Astrid, Mrs. Ferner (born 1932), the second daughter of King Olav V of Norway (1903–1991)
Rosalie Ferner, Professor of Neurology at Guys and St Thomas's Hospital and the Department of Clinical Neuroscience at King's College London
Ferner Nuhn (1903–1989), American author, literary critic, and artist born in Cedar Falls, Iowa

See also
FERN
Fener
Fern
Fernery